Lautoka Football Club is a Fijian professional football club based in Lautoka that competes in the Fiji Premier League, the top flight of Fijian football. Their home stadium is Churchill Park. The club was formed in 1934.

History
Lautoka Soccer Football Association was formed in 1934, under the leadership of John Bairagi. In 1961, Lautoka became affiliated with the Fiji Football Association.

Lautoka has the record of highest goals scored in the Inter-District Championship (IDC) finals. Lautoka thumped Ba in the finals one year by 6–0  and by 7–0 another year and also beat Suva in one of the finals by 7–1. That record  remains untouched till this day.

Lautoka is also the first team to win the IDC 3 years in a row. They have also qualified for the 2009–10 OFC Champions League by finishing on top of the Fiji National league table and also remaining undefeated.

Current squad
Squad for 2022 OFC Champions League

Personnel

Current technical staff

Achievements
League Championship (for Districts): 6
 1984, 1988, 2009, 2017, 2018, 2021.

 Inter-District Championship: 18
 1941, 1942, 1949, 1950, 1953, 1957, 1958, 1959, 1962, 1964, 1965, 1973, 1984, 1985, 2005, 2008, 2017, 2018.

Battle of the Giants: 2
 1985, 2016.

Fiji Football Association Cup Tournament: 2
 2000, 2002.

Champion versus Champion Series: 2
 2009, 2016.

Performance in OFC competitions
OFC Champions League: 4 appearances

2010: 2nd in Group B
2011: 3rd in Group A
2018: Runners-up
2019: 3rd in Group B

See also
 Fiji Football Association

References

Bibliography
 M. Prasad, Sixty Years of Soccer in Fiji 1938–1998: The Official History of the Fiji Football Association, Fiji Football Association, Suva, 1998.

External links
 Lautoka FC Official Website

Football clubs in Fiji
1934 establishments in Fiji
Association football clubs established in 1934